During the 1997–98 English football season, West Bromwich Albion F.C. competed in the Football League First Division.

Season summary
In the first few months of the 1997–98 season, West Brom established themselves in the top six. Harford then stunned Albion supporters by moving to QPR after less than a year in charge, making way for Denis Smith,  who struggled to maintain the momentum created by Harford, and the Baggies could only finish 10th.

Final league table

Results
West Bromwich Albion's score comes first

Legend

Football League First Division

FA Cup

League Cup

First-team squad
Squad at end of season

Notes

References

West Bromwich Albion F.C. seasons
West Bromwich Albion